The Dina-2 gas field is a natural gas field located in Xinjiang. It was discovered in 1998 and developed by and China National Petroleum Corporation. It began production in 2004 and produces natural gas and condensates. The total proven reserves of the Dina-2 gas field are around 6.12 trillion cubic feet (175 km³), and production is slated to be around 180 million cubic feet/day (5.14×105m³) in 2010.

References

Natural gas fields in China